James J. Silva (born December 14, 1984) is an American former college and professional football player who was a safety in the National Football League (NFL) for three seasons.  He played college football for Boston College, and earned consensus All-American honors.  He was signed by the Colts as an undrafted free agent in 2008.

Early years
Silva was born in East Providence, Rhode Island.  He attended East Providence High School, and was a standout high school football player for the East Providence Townies.

College career
Silva attended Boston College, where he played for the Boston College Eagles from 2003 to 2007.  He redshirted as a true freshman in 2003.  As a senior in 2007, Silva recorded 125 tackles (82 unassisted) and eight interceptions, being the only player in NCAA history to ever accomplish this. For this, he was named a consensus first-team All-America selection, as well as one of three finalists for the Jim Thorpe Award, given annually to the nation's top defensive back. He was also named the most valuable player of the 2007 Champs Sports Bowl, in which the Eagles defeated the Michigan State Spartans 24-21; Silva gained 10 tackles and two interceptions.  He played in the 2008 East/West Shrine game and was voted captain by his teammates. He majored in communications.

Professional career

Indianapolis Colts (2008-2011)
Silva went undrafted in the 2008 NFL Draft and was signed by the Indianapolis Colts as an undrafted free agent on May 2. He recorded seventeen tackles during the 2008 season.

Jamie was a member of the 2009 Indianapolis Colts. He served as a special team specialist as well as the second string free safety. Silva recorded 32 tackles and deflected 2 passes in his second season. As well as 4 post season tackles. Silva and the Colts advanced to Super Bowl XLIV, where they faced the New Orleans Saints. The Colts were defeated 31-17.

During the first preseason game of the 2010 season, Silva sustained a torn ACL, MCL, and crushed knee joint causing him to miss the rest of the year.  The doctors never cleared Silva to play again.

On July 26, 2011, the Colts surrendered the rights to Silva making him an unrestricted free agent.

Personal life
Silva and his wife Theresa reside in Pittsburgh, Pennsylvania. They have 4 daughters and a son. Silva was an assistant coach on the Mt. Lebanon High School football team in the fall of 2016. He is also a cousin of USA Women’s Hockey player Kacey Bellamy.

References

External links
Boston College Eagles bio
Indianapolis Colts bio
NFL Draft Bio

1984 births
Living people
All-American college football players
American people of Portuguese descent
American football safeties
Boston College Eagles football players
People from East Providence, Rhode Island
Indianapolis Colts players
High school football coaches in Pennsylvania